William Harlow (born December 5, 1943) is an American retired freestyle wrestler. 

He wrestled for St. Andrew School in his hometown of Sewanee, Tennessee, and enjoyed much success. A senior in 1962, he was the national prep, state and Mid-South champion (the last for the fifth time). 

He also won the Big Eight Conference title as a junior. (The university holds the record for most national titles.) His record at OSU is 54 wins, five losses and two ties.

After leaving OSU, Harlow went on to win three national titles. He won a silver medal at the 1970 World Wrestling Championships, falling to Soviet Gennady Strakhov in the final. He is considered by some to be the greatest wrestler ever from the state of Tennessee.

He became a high school coach, administrator and principal, finally retiring in 2013.

He was inducted into the National Wrestling Hall of Fame in 2016.

References 

1943 births
Living people
American male sport wrestlers
Oklahoma State Cowboys wrestlers
People from Sewanee, Tennessee
Wrestlers at the 1967 Pan American Games